Ukrainian Civil War may refer to:

War of Independence 
War in Donbas

See also
 List of wars involving Ukraine
 List of invasions and occupations of Ukraine